"The General Was Female?" is the sixth episode in the documentary series America's Hidden Stories that argues that Revolutionary War General Casimir Pulaski was intersex. It first aired on Smithsonian Channel on April 8, 2019.

See also
 Intersex people in the United States military

References

Further reading 
 Staff (April 5, 2019) "The general was female?: ASU professor, colleague uncover 200-year-old mystery from the American Revolution" Arizona State University

External links 
 The General Was Female?  on smithsonianchannel.com

Intersex people and military service in the United States
Smithsonian Channel original programming
Casimir Pulaski
LGBT and military-related mass media
2019 American television episodes